Bradley Ralph (born October 17, 1980) is a Canadian retired professional ice hockey left winger and is the head coach of the Florida Everblades of the ECHL. He played in one National Hockey League game for the Phoenix Coyotes during the 2000–01 NHL season.

Career
Ralph was a career minor-leaguer, highlighted by playing one game in the NHL. He skated in the ECHL (for the Mississippi Sea Wolves, Augusta Lynx, Dayton Bombers, Columbia Inferno, and Charlotte Checkers) and American Hockey League (for the Springfield Falcons and Hershey Bears) in the United States, as well as a season each for Alleghe HC in Serie A in Italy and AaB Ishockey in the AL-Bank Ligaen in Denmark.

After his playing career, Ralph began coaching hockey, spending two years as head coach for the Augusta RiverHawks in the Southern Professional Hockey League and of the Idaho Steelheads in the ECHL.

On August 4, 2015, Ralph was named head coach of the Western Hockey League's Kelowna Rockets.

On July 12, 2016, he was named the head coach of the Florida Everblades in the ECHL. He was named Coach of the Year for the 2017–18 season.

Career statistics

Regular season and playoffs

Awards and honours

See also
List of players who played only one game in the NHL

References

External links

1980 births
Living people
Arizona Coyotes draft picks
Augusta Lynx players
Canadian expatriate ice hockey players in Italy
Canadian ice hockey coaches
Canadian ice hockey left wingers
Charlotte Checkers (1993–2010) players
Columbia Inferno players
Dayton Bombers players
ECHL coaches
HC Alleghe players
Hershey Bears players
Ice hockey people from Ottawa
Kelowna Rockets coaches
Mississippi Sea Wolves players
Oshawa Generals players
Phoenix Coyotes players
Springfield Falcons players